KAvZ is a bus manufacturer in Kurgan, KGN, Russia. The factory started producing buses in 1958, based on trucks from GAZ. During the 1990s, it assembled Ikarus buses for the Russian market. Now a subsidiary of GAZ, it specialises in producing small buses, in particular school buses.

KAvZ is a subsidiary of Russian Buses which is a subsidiary of GAZ Group. Starting in 2015, the GAZ Group has introduced a single brand for all its bus manufacturing subsidiaries, and newly manufactured vehicles now feature the deer badge of the GAZ company.

Models

Current
 KAvZ-4238 Aurora (2006–present)
 KAvZ-4235 Aurora (2008–present)
 KAvZ-4270 (2016–present)

Former
 KAvZ-651 (1958-1973)
 KAvZ-663 (1961-1966)
 KAvZ-685/3270/3271 (1971-1991)
 KAvZ-3100 (1976)
 KAvZ-49471 (1981-1985) -truckbus
 KAvZ-4959 (1985) -truckbus
 KAvZ-3275 (1991-1998)
 KAvZ-3976 (1993-2007)
 KAvZ-4229 (1998)
 KAvZ-4224 (1998-2003) -truckbus
 KAvZ-3244 (1998-2007)
 KAvZ-39766 (2002-2008)
 KAvZ-4239 (2008-2014)

References

External links

Official site (Russian)
Official website (English)
Profile on the GAZ website
Cars from East

Bus manufacturers of Russia
GAZ Group
Bus manufacturers of the Soviet Union
Companies based in Kurgan, Kurgan Oblast
Vehicle manufacturing companies established in 1958
Russian brands
Soviet brands
1958 establishments in Russia